Velika Pirešica is a settlement north of Žalec in east-central Slovenia. The area is part of the traditional region of Styria. The entire Municipality of Žalec is now included in the Savinja Statistical Region.

References

External links
Velika Pirešica at Geopedia

Populated places in the Municipality of Žalec